Kannan Varuvaan is a 2000 Indian Tamil-language film written and directed by Sundar C. The film stars Karthik, Manthra and Divya Unni, while Goundamani, Senthil, Manorama, Ranjith and Radha Ravi play supporting roles. The music was composed by Sirpy with editing done by P. Sai Suresh and cinematography by U. K. Senthil Kumar. The film released on 25 May 2000. The film was average success at box office.

Plot 
Kannan's ambition in life is to take up the construction of the temple left incomplete by his forefathers. Unfortunately, funds are not forthcoming. Thannirmalai assures Kannan that with his employer's help, Kannan's dream could become a reality. Unfortunately for Thannirmalai, he becomes disappointed when his employer, the wealthy landlady Ranganayagi's grandson Raghu, turns out to be money-minded and heartless. In a fit of anger, Thannirmalai pushes Raghu into a river and thinks that he has committed a murder. Kannan is made to enter the scene as an impostor by pretending to be Raghu. Meanwhile, there is a love triangle between Kannan, Rajeswari and Parvathi. What follows forms the crux of the story.

Cast

Karthik as Kannan/Raghu
Manthra as Rajeshwari
Divya Unni as Parvathi (Voice dubbed by Jayageetha)
Goundamani as Thannirmalai/Adiyapatham/Ezhumalai
Manorama as Ranganayaki (Aatha)
Ranjith as Raghu
Radha Ravi
Senthil as Sooravali
Soori as Man in a temple
Ishari K. Ganesh as Government Servant
Kazan Khan
Mayilsamy
Theni Kunjarammal
Periya Karuppu Thevar
Balu Anand
Vichu Vishwanath
Halwa Vasu
Nellai Siva
K. S. Jayalakshmi
Chelladurai as Parvathi's uncle
Sujith Sagar as Collector
Vijay Ganesh as Servant
Anuja
Deepika
Ravichandran
Amulraj Vaathiyar

Soundtrack
The soundtrack was composed by Sirpy.

References

External links

2000 films
2000s Tamil-language films
Films directed by Sundar C.